The 2000–01 Boston Bruins season was the club's 78th season of operation in the National Hockey League (NHL). The team finished ninth in the Eastern Conference that year, failing to qualify for the Stanley Cup playoffs for the second consecutive year, which was also the first time the team missed out on the playoffs in consecutive years since the 1960s. It was also the first full season the Bruins were without longtime team captain Ray Bourque since the 1979–80 season, who would win the Stanley Cup as a member of the Colorado Avalanche at season's end and subsequently retire from the NHL.

The Bruins tied the Carolina Hurricanes in points for the regular season at 88. However, Carolina had two more wins than the Bruins, leaving the Bruins in the ninth position in the conference, narrowly missing the playoffs. Boston was without starting goaltender Byron Dafoe for much of the season, and the Bruins had to use five goaltenders throughout the season. The good news is that the Bruins saw some of their young core mature further, as Joe Thornton set a then-career high in goals with 37, and Jason Allison once again broke the 30-goal plateau.

Off-season

Regular season

Final standings

Schedule and results

Player statistics

Regular season
Scoring

Goaltending

Awards and records

Transactions

Draft picks
Boston's draft picks at the 2000 NHL Entry Draft held at the Pengrowth Saddledome in Calgary, Alberta.

See also
2000–01 NHL season

References
 

Boston Bruins
Boston Bruins
Boston Bruins seasons
Boston Bruins
Boston Bruins
Bruins
Bruins